Joseph Egbert (April 10, 1807 – July 7, 1888) was an American farmer and politician who served one term as a U.S. Representative from New York from 1841 to 1843.

Biography 
Born near Bull Head, Staten Island, New York, Egbert attended the common schools.
He engaged in agricultural pursuits.

Congress 
Egbert was elected as a Democrat to the Twenty-seventh Congress (March 4, 1841 – March 3, 1843).
He was not a candidate for renomination in 1842.

Later career and death 
He resumed agricultural pursuits.
Supervisor of Southfield, Richmond County, in 1855 and 1856.
County clerk of Richmond County in 1869.
He died at his home near New Dorp, New York, July 7, 1888.
He was interred in the Moravian Cemetery, New Dorp, Staten Island, New York.

References

1807 births
1888 deaths
Democratic Party members of the United States House of Representatives from New York (state)
19th-century American politicians
Burials at Moravian Cemetery
People from New Dorp, Staten Island